2C-C is a psychedelic drug of the 2C family. It was first synthesized by Alexander Shulgin, sometimes used as an entheogen. In his book PiHKAL (Phenethylamines i Have Known And Loved), Shulgin lists the dosage range as 20–40 mg. 2C-C is usually taken orally, but may also be insufflated. 2C-C is schedule I of section 202(c) of the Controlled Substances Act in the United States, signed into law as of July, 2012 under the Food and Drug Administration Safety and Innovation Act.

Not much information is known about the toxicity of 2C-C.

Effects
Over the approximate dose range 20–40 mg, visual effects last approximately 4 to 8 hours.

Drug prohibition laws

China
As of October 2015 2C-C is a controlled substance in China.

Canada
As of October 31, 2016; 2C-C is a controlled substance (Schedule III) in Canada.

Germany
2C-C is an Anlage I controlled drug.

Sweden
Sveriges riksdags health ministry Statens folkhälsoinstitut classified 2C-C as "health hazard" under the act Lagen om förbud mot vissa hälsofarliga varor (translated Act on the Prohibition of Certain Goods Dangerous to Health) as of Mar 1, 2005, in their regulation SFS 2005:26 listed as 2,5-dimetoxi-4-klorfenetylamin (2C-C), making it illegal to sell or possess.

United States
As of July 9, 2012, in the United States 2C-C is a Schedule I substance under the Food and Drug Administration Safety and Innovation Act of 2012, making possession, distribution and manufacture illegal.

Analogues and derivatives

See also
 Phenethylamines
 DOC

References

External links
 Erowid 2C-C Vault

2C (psychedelics)
Chlorobenzenes
Designer drugs